Orsans is a commune in the Aude department in southern France.

Orsans is a small hamlet in the south of France, it used to be an important village with a school and many farming supplies, but now is just a small farming community. There is a medieval church and there used to be a large windmill on the hill, which is now gone; however, the storage house (which was also a cowshed for a while) remains, now converted into a house. There is a statue in the square which celebrates the ceased or injured form Orsans in World War I. A small stream runs through the hills that are used for farming. On top of the largest hill in or sans there is a large old water tower, that is surrounded by cows.

Population

See also
Communes of the Aude department

References

Communes of Aude
Aude communes articles needing translation from French Wikipedia